Base circle may refer to:

Base circle (mechanics), a circular line in gear wheels
Base circle (mathematics), a historical synonym for unit circle in mathematics